In mathematics, a Hausdorff space is said to be H-closed, or Hausdorff closed, or absolutely closed if it is  closed in every Hausdorff space containing it as a subspace.  This property  is a generalization of compactness, since a compact subset of a Hausdorff space is closed. Thus, every compact Hausdorff space is H-closed. The notion of an H-closed space has been introduced in 1924 by P. Alexandroff and P. Urysohn.

Examples and equivalent formulations

 The unit interval , endowed with the smallest topology which refines the euclidean topology, and contains  as an open set is H-closed but not compact.
 Every regular Hausdorff H-closed space is compact.
 A Hausdorff space is H-closed if and only if every open cover has a finite subfamily with dense union.

See also

Compact space

References

 K.P. Hart, Jun-iti Nagata, J.E. Vaughan (editors), Encyclopedia of General Topology, Chapter d20 (by Jack Porter and Johannes Vermeer)

Properties of topological spaces
Compactness (mathematics)